Simeon Stylites III was a pillar hermit bearing the same name as Simeon Stylites and Simeon Stylites the Younger.

He is honoured by both the Greek Orthodox Church and the Coptic Church. He is hence believed to have lived in the fifth century before the breach which occurred between these Churches. However, very little certain is known of him. He is believed to have been struck by lightning upon his pillar, built near Hegca in Cilicia.

References

Year of birth missing
Year of death missing
Syrian Christian saints
Stylites
5th-century Christian saints